Miguel Ángel Ponce Briseño (born 12 April 1989), also known as Pocho, is a professional footballer who plays as a left-back. Born in the United States, he represented the Mexico national team. He is an Olympic gold medalist.

Early life
Ponce moved with his family from Sacramento to Guadalajara before he was 1, then to Tijuana when he was 10 to enable visits from his father, who worked building bridges in California. Wanting his son to learn English, his father arranged for him to use a friend's address in San Ysidro, San Diego as a base to attend US schools. He played association football for four years at San Ysidro Middle School and San Ysidro High School before being invited to a tryout by C.D. Guadalajara at age 15.

Club career

Guadalajara
Ponce scored his first goal for Chivas on September 28, 2010 in the 71st minute of the game against Tigres UANL rescuing the team from a loss of the game with a 1-1 end. He scored once again on October 3, 2010 against local rival Atlas. Ponce ended the 2010–2011 season with two goals in 30 games.

Toluca
Ponce quickly established himself as the starting left-back in José Cardozo's starting eleven. Despite having a successful year with Toluca, the club announced they were not going to accept the purchase option included in the loan agreement.

Necaxa
On June 7, 2017 Ponce was sent out on loan to Necaxa.

International career

Youth
In 2011, Ponce was selected to participate in the 2011 Pan American Games, Mexico won gold after defeating Argentina in the final. in 2012 Ponce participated in the 2012 Olympic Qualifying Tournament and scored twice in the tournament. Ponce participated in the 2012 Toulon Tournament and helped Mexico win the final against Turkey. Miguel Ponce made the final cut for those participating in the 2012 Summer Olympics, Miguel Ponce played 4 matches in the 2012 Olympics including the 2–1 win over Brazil in the gold medal match at Wembley Stadium.

Senior
Ponce was part of the preliminary list of players that would participate in the Copa America in Argentina. Later, he also appeared in the definitive list for those participating in the tournament. He made his senior national team debut with Mexico at the 2011 Copa América July 8, 2011 against Perú entering as a substitute for Dárvin Chávez in the 73' minute of the game. However Mexico used a youth team in the tournament and participation by Mexico, as non conference member of CONMEBOL and guest invitee, were deemed friendly matches for Mexico. Miguel Ponce made his first competitive appearance for Mexico with the senior squad in a 2013 CONCACAF Gold Cup match against Canada that also, given his dual US-Mexican citizenship, cap-tied him to Mexico.

Career statistics

International

International goals

Scores and results list Mexico's goal tally first.

Honours
Guadalajara
Liga MX: Clausura 2017
Copa MX: Apertura 2015, Clausura 2017
Supercopa MX: 2016

Necaxa
Copa MX: Clausura 2018

Mexico U23
Pan American Games: 2011
CONCACAF Olympic Qualifying Championship: 2012
Toulon Tournament: 2012
Olympic Gold Medal: 2012

References

External links
  at Chivas de Guadalajara 
 
 
 
 
 

1989 births
Living people
American emigrants to Mexico
Association football defenders
Mexican footballers
Mexico international footballers
American sportspeople of Mexican descent
Liga MX players
C.D. Guadalajara footballers
Deportivo Toluca F.C. players
Footballers at the 2011 Pan American Games
2011 Copa América players
2013 CONCACAF Gold Cup players
2014 FIFA World Cup players
Olympic footballers of Mexico
Footballers at the 2012 Summer Olympics
Olympic gold medalists for Mexico
Olympic medalists in football
Medalists at the 2012 Summer Olympics
Soccer players from California
Pan American Games gold medalists for Mexico
Pan American Games medalists in football
Medalists at the 2011 Pan American Games